Sampford could refer to:

Sampford Arundel, Somerset
Sampford Brett, Somerset
Sampford Courtenay, Devon
Sampford Peverell, Devon
Sampford Spiney, Devon
Great Sampford and Little Sampford, Essex
RAF Great Sampford, a military airfield in Essex